Pozantı railway station is a railway station in the town of Pozantı, Turkey. Situated in the Taurus Mountains, Pozantı is the northernmost station in the Adana Province. Due to its geographical location near the Cilician Gates, the station was historically a resting stop for trains crossing the mountain range. The station was originally opened on 21 December 1912 by the Baghdad Railway.

Pozantı station consists of an island platform serving two tracks, with a total of four tracks. The other two tracks are used as a siding.

TCDD Taşımacılık operates two daily intercity trains from Konya and Kayseri to Adana.

Images

References

External links
TCDD Taşımacılık
Passenger trains
Pozantı station information
Pozantı station timetable

Railway stations in Adana Province
Railway stations opened in 1912
1912 establishments in the Ottoman Empire